Sajjad Anoushiravani Hamlabad (born 12 May 1984 in Ardabil) is an Iranian weightlifter in the +105 kg category . He was the head coach of Iran's weightlifting team at Rio Olympics in summer 2016, that won two golds. Sajjad won the silver medal at the 2012 Summer Olympics in the men's +105 kg category with a total of 449 kg.

Major result

References

External links
 
 
 
 
 

1984 births
Iranian male weightlifters
World Weightlifting Championships medalists
Iranian strength athletes
People from Ardabil
Living people
Asian Games bronze medalists for Iran
Asian Games medalists in weightlifting
Olympic medalists in weightlifting
Olympic silver medalists for Iran
Olympic weightlifters of Iran
Weightlifters at the 2012 Summer Olympics
Islamic Azad University, Central Tehran Branch alumni
Weightlifters at the 2010 Asian Games
Medalists at the 2012 Summer Olympics
Medalists at the 2010 Asian Games
21st-century Iranian people